Events in the year 1847 in Portugal.

Incumbents
Monarch: Mary II
Prime Ministers: João Carlos Saldanha de Oliveira Daun, 1st Duke of Saldanha

Events
29 June – Convention of Gramido

Arts and entertainment

Sports

Births

27 July – Sebastião Custódio de Sousa Teles, military officer and politician (died 1921)
4 November – Infante Augusto, Duke of Coimbra, Royal prince (died 1889)
24 December – Jaime Batalha Reis, agronomist and diplomat.

Deaths

References

 
1840s in Portugal
Years of the 19th century in Portugal
Portugal